Strelley Estate is a post war housing estate located in the Bilborough ward in the City of Nottingham. At the 2001 census, the estate had a population of 2,561.

Facilities
The Strelley Estate has a number of facilities located on Strelley Road including an Asda supermarket, The Rose Inn, a police station and a recreation ground next to the A6002 road, and there is a fish bar, a Premier convenience store and a chemist located on Flamsteed Road. Other facilities include the Djanogly Strelley Academy off Cranwell Road.

The Strelley Estate also includes the Nottingham Business Park and a tiny portion of the M1. The Nottingham Belfry hotel is located next to the business park, as well as newly built housing around Princess Boulevard.

Demographics
According to the 2001 census data, the estate has a population of 2,561. A majority of the population is aged 25–44 who make up 29.2% of the population.
The census also shows that 91.8% of the population is White British, as well as 0.9% being White Irish and 0.8% being classed as Other White. 3.1% of the population is Mixed Race, 1.0% is Asian or Asian British and 2.2% is Black or Black British.

Religion
The 2001 census shows that 65.8% of the estate's population are Christian and Atheists make up 23% of the population. 0.7% of the population practice Hinduism, and Islam, Sikhism and Buddhism each score 0.5%. 8.8% of the population did not state their religion.
Strelley has The Ark Church located on Strelley Road, and Kingdom Hall of Jehovah's Witnesses Church on Flamsteed Road.

Transport
Nottingham City Transport
 35: Nottingham → Derby Road → QMC → University Park → Wollaton Vale → Bilborough → Strelley → Bulwell

 35B: Nottingham → Derby Road → QMC → University Park → Wollaton Vale → Bilborough → Strelley

 77: Nottingham → Alfreton Road → Aspley Lane → Strelley

 77C: Nottingham → Alfreton Road → Aspley Lane → Strelley → Cinderhill

 78: Nottingham → Alfreton Road → Nuthall Road → Broxtowe → Strelley

 N77: Nottingham → Alfreton Road → Aspley Lane → Strelley → Cinderhill → Whitemoor

Nottingham Community Transport
 L2: Nottingham → Derby Road → QMC → Wollaton → Bilborough → Strelley (Nottingham Business Park) → Assarts Farm Estate

 L3: Nottingham → Derby Road → QMC → Beechdale → Bilborough → Strelley

References

Areas of Nottingham